Cathal Óg Mac Maghnusa (February 1439 – March 1498) was an Irish historian. He was the principal compiler of the Annals of Ulster, along with the scribe Ruaidhrí Ó Luinín. He was also chief of the McManus clan from 1488 to 1498.

References

Cathal Óg Mac Maghnusa  and the Annals of Ulster, by Aubrey Gwynn, in Clougher Record, 2/2 (1958) pp. 230–43 and 2/3 (1959), pp. 370–84. Ed. Nollaig Ó Muraíle, Enniskillen, 1998. 
Cathal Óg Mac Maghnusa: His Time, Life and Legacy, by Nollaig Ó Muraíle, in Clougher Record, pp. 45–64, 1998

People from County Fermanagh
1439 births
1498 deaths
15th-century Irish historians
Irish-language writers